The 2003 Giro d'Italia was the 86th edition of the Giro d'Italia, one of cycling's Grand Tours. The Giro began in Lecce, with a flat stage on 10 May, and Stage 12 occurred on 22 May with a stage from San Donà di Piave. The race finished in Milan on 1 June.

Stage 12
22 May 2003 — San Donà di Piave to Monte Zoncolan,

Stage 13
23 May 2003 — Pordenone to Marostica,

Stage 14
24 May 2003 — Marostica to Alpe di Pampeago,

Stage 15
25 May 2003 — Merano to Bolzano,  (ITT)

Stage 16
26 May 2003 — Arco to Pavia,

Rest day
27 May 2003

Stage 17
28 May 2003 — Salice Terme to Asti,

Stage 18
29 May 2003 — Sanuario di Vicoforte to Chianale,

Stage 19
30 May 2003 — Canelli to Cascata del Toce,

Stage 20
31 May 2003 — Cannobio to Cantù,

Stage 21
1 June 2003 — Milan to Milan,  (ITT)

References

2003 Giro d'Italia
Giro d'Italia stages